Samantha Crawford was the defending champion having won the 2012 event, but chose not to compete in 2013.

Ana Konjuh won the tournament, defeating Tornado Alicia Black in the final, 3–6, 6–4, 7–6(8–6).

Seeds

Main draw

Finals

Top half

Section 1

Section 2

Bottom half

Section 3

Section 4

External links 
 Main draw

Girls' Singles
US Open, 2013 Girls' Singles